This is a timeline documenting the events of heavy metal music in the year 1995.

Newly formed bands
 Aborted
After Forever
 Agalloch
Agathodaimon 
Aghora  
Angelcorpse
Arch Enemy
Astarte
Autumn
Ayreon
Azaghal
A.C.T
The Berzerker
The Blood Divine
Bongzilla
 Borknagar
Buckcherry
Carnival in Coal
Catamenia 
Cave In 
 Chevelle
Chthonic 
Church of Misery
Cipher System
 Coheed and Cambria
 Crazy Town
Dahmer
 Darkest Hour
Darzamat
Devourment
Diablo
Die Apokalyptischen Reiter
Dimension Zero
Disembodied
 Disturbed (as Brawl)
Dog Fashion Disco
Dry Kill Logic
 Ensiferum
Entwine
 Evergrey
 Evanescence
Forest Stream
The Fucking Champs
 Godsmack
Greenmachine
Grinspoon
GZR
Handsome
Hate Forest
I Shalt Become
Impaled 
In Extremo
Iron Fire
Kraljevski Apartman
Krieg 
Macbeth
Månegarm
 Melechesh
Metalucifer
Moonsorrow
Morning Again
 Motograter
Nickelback
Night in Gales
Nortt
One Minute Silence
Orange Goblin
Otyg
Reverend Bizarre
Secrets of the Moon
Shadows Fall
Shai Hulud
Silencer 
 Silent Stream of Godless Elegy
Silentium
Skyfire 
Skyforger
 Slipknot
Snot 
Soilwork 
 Solefald
Sólstafir
Sonata Arctica
 Staind
Ten
Theory in Practice
Thy Serpent
 Thyrfing
Tristania
Triumphator
Tuatha de Danann
Vanishing Point
 Virgin Black
Will Haven
Wolf
Wolverine
 Xasthur

Albums

 24-7 Spyz – Temporarily Disconnected
 AC/DC – Ballbreaker
 Alice Cooper – Classicks
 Alice in Chains – Alice in Chains
 Amorphis - Black Winter Day (EP)
 Anathema – The Silent Enigma
 Anathema - Pentecost III (EP)
 Anthrax – Stomp 442
 At the Gates – Slaughter of the Soul
 Ayreon – The Final Experiment
 Bad Brains – God of Love
 Bal-Sagoth – A Black Moon Broods Over Lemuria
 Behemoth – Sventevith (Storming Near the Baltic)
 Belphegor – The Last Supper
 Benediction - The Dreams You Dread
 Beowülf – 2 Cents
 Bestial Warlust - Blood & Valour
 Black Sabbath – Cross Purposes Live (live box set)
 Black Sabbath – Forbidden
 Blind Guardian – Imaginations from the Other Side
 Bruce Dickinson – Alive in Studio A (live)
 Cancer - Black Faith
 Carcass – Swansong
 Cathedral – The Carnival Bizarre
 Clawfinger – Use Your Brain
 Comecon - Fable Frolic
 Craig Goldy - Better Late Than Never
 Crematory – Illusions
 Crowbar – Time Heals Nothing 
 The Crown - The Burning (as Crown of Thorns)
 Cruachan – Tuatha na Gael
 D-A-D – Good Clean Family Entertainment You Can Trust
 Damaged - Passive Backseat Demon Engines (EP)
 Dangerous Toys – The Rtist 4merly Known As Dangerous Toys
 Dark Avenger – Dark Avenger
 Dark Tranquillity – The Gallery
 Darkthrone – Panzerfaust
 Dawn - Nær Solen Gar Niþer For Evogher 
 Death – Symbolic
 Deceased - The Blueprints for Madness
 Def Leppard – Vault Greatest Hits 1980–1995 (compilation)
 Deftones – Adrenaline
 Deicide – Once upon the Cross
 Deliverance – Camelot in Smithereens
 Dimmu Borgir – For all tid
 Dismember – Massive Killing Capacity
 Dismember – Casket Garden (EP)
 Dissection – Storm of the Light's Bane
 Dokken – Dysfunctional
 Down – NOLA
 Dream Theater – A Change of Seasons (EP)
 Earth Crisis – Destroy the Machines
 Edguy – Savage Poetry
 Excel – Seeking Refuge
 Extreme – Waiting for the Punchline
 FireHouse – 3 (FireHouse album)
 Faith No More – King for a Day... Fool for a Lifetime
 Fear Factory – Demanufacture
 Fight – A Small Deadly Space
 Flotsam and Jetsam – Drift
 Forced Entry – The Shore (EP)
 Fu Manchu – Daredevil
 Funeral – Tragedies
 Gamma Ray – Land of the Free
 The Gathering - Mandylion
 Ghostorm - Frozen in Fire
 Grave Digger -  Heart of Darkness
 Grip Inc. – The Power of Inner Strength
 Gwar – Ragnarök 
 Helmet  – Born Annoying
 Helstar – Multiples of Black
 Iced Earth – Burnt Offerings
 Illdisposed - Submit
 Immortal – Battles in the North
 In Flames – Subterranean (EP)
 Incubus – Fungus Amongus
 Integrity – Systems Overload
 Iron Maiden – The X Factor
 Joe Satriani – Joe Satriani
 Kamelot – Eternity
 Kataklysm - Sorcery
 Katatonia - For Funerals to Come... (EP)
 Kix – Show Business
 King Diamond – The Spider's Lullabye
 Konkhra – Spit or Swallow
 Krabathor - Lies
 Krabathor - The Rise of Brutality (EP)
 Kreator – Cause for Conflict
 Krisiun – Black Force Domain
 Kyuss – ...And the Circus Leaves Town
 Lacrimosa – Inferno
 Lord Belial – Kiss the Goat
 Love/Hate – Im Not Happy
 Mad Season – Above
 Malevolent Creation – Eternal
 Marilyn Manson – Smells Like Children (EP)
 Megadeth – Hidden Treasures (EP)
 Meshuggah – Destroy Erase Improve
 Metal Massacre - Metal Massacre XII (Compilation, various artists)
 Mindrot - Dawning
 Mindrot - Forlorn (EP)
 Monster Magnet – Dopes to Infinity
 Moonspell – Wolfheart
 Morbid Angel – Domination
 Morgana Lefay – Sanctified
 Mortician - House by the Cemetery (EP)
 Mortification - Primitive Rhythm Machine
 Motörhead – Sacrifice
 Mr. Bungle – Disco Volante
 My Dying Bride – The Angel and the Dark River
 Necrophagist – Necrophagist (demo)
 Nembrionic - Psycho One Hundred
 Nevermore – Nevermore
 Night in Gales - Sylphlike (EP)
 Nightfall – Athenian Echoes
 Ningen Isu – Odoru Issunboushi
 Nothingface – Nothingface
 Novembers Doom - Amid Its Hallowed Mirth
 Oomph! – Defekt
 Opeth – Orchid
 Orphanage - Oblivion
 Ozzy Osbourne – Ozzmosis
 Paradise Lost – Draconian Times
 Pessimist - Absence of Light (EP)
 Powerman 5000 – The Blood-Splat Rating System
 Primus - Tales from the Punchbowl
 Quiet Riot – Down to the Bone
 Rage – Black in Mind
 Rainbow – Stranger in Us All
 Rammstein – Herzeleid
 Red Hot Chili Peppers – One Hot Minute
 Roxx Gang – The Voodoo You Love
 Running Wild – Masquerade
 Saint Vitus – Die Healing
 Samael - Rebellion (EP)
 Savatage – Dead Winter Dead
 Savatage – Japan Live '94 (live)
 Savatage – Ghost in the Ruins – A Tribute to Criss Oliva (live)
 Saxon – Dogs of War
 Sentenced – Amok
 Sentenced – Love & Death (EP)
 Septicflesh – Esoptron
 Sinister - Hate
 Six Feet Under - Haunted
 Skepticism - Stormcrowfleet
 Skid Row – Subhuman Race
 Skyclad – The Silent Whales of Lunar Sea
 Slash's Snakepit – It's Five O'Clock Somewhere (album)
 Slaughter – Fear No Evil
 Sodom – Masquerade in Blood
 Strapping Young Lad – Heavy as a Really Heavy Thing
 Stratovarius – Fourth Dimension
 Stuck Mojo – Snappin' Necks
 Suffocation - Pierced from Within
 Summoning – Lugburz
 Summoning – Minas Morgul
 Symphony X – The Damnation Game
 Tad Morose – Sender of Thoughts
 Tankard – The Tankard
 Theatre of Tragedy – Theatre of Tragedy
 Therapy? – Infernal Love
 Therion - Lepaca Kliffoth
 The 3rd and the Mortal – Nightswan (EP)
 Tony MacAlpine – Evolution
 Trouble – Plastic Green Head
 Tuff – Religious Fix
 Unanimated - Ancient God of Evil
 Uncle Slam – When God Dies
 Unleashed – Victory
 Uriah Heep - Sea of Light
 Steve Vai – Alien Love Secrets (EP)
 Vader – De Profundis
 Van Halen – Balance
 Vince Neil – Carved in Stone
 Virgin Black – Virgin Black (demo)
 Vital Remains – Into Cold Darkness
 Voivod – Negatron
 W.A.S.P. – Still Not Black Enough
 Warrant – Ultraphobic
 Warrior Soul – The Space Age Playboys
 White Zombie – Astro-Creep: 2000
 Y&T – Musically Incorrect
 Yngwie Malmsteen – Magnum Opus

Disbandments
 Accept
 Beowülf
 Child's Play
 The Cult
 Excel
 Kyuss (in October)
 Living Colour
 Pungent Stench
 Saint Vitus
 Suicidal Tendencies
 Uncle Slam

Events
 Motörhead's guitarist Michael "Würzel" Burston leaves the band.
 Ingo Schwichtenberg of Helloween dies.
 Necrophagist's guitarist Jan-Paul Herm and drummer Raphael Kempermann leave the band. Kempermann is replaced by Daniel Silva.
 S.O.B.'s vocalist Tottsuan commits suicide by jumping onto railroad tracks.
 Ralf Scheepers leaving Gamma Ray year earlier, Kai Hansen goes on lead vocals. First time since his 1985 debut album Walls of Jericho.
 Matt Holt joins Nothingface, replacing David Gabbard as singer.

1990s in heavy metal music
Metal